Musayelyan may refer to:
Musayelyan, Shirak, a village in northern part of Shirak province, Armenia
Basen, Armenia, a village in the eastern part of Shirak province, Armenia formerly known as Musayelyan